Angela Susan Roberts is a New Zealand teacher, unionist and politician.

Early life and career
Roberts spent 20 years in the education sector teaching economics and drama. In 2013 Roberts became President of the Post Primary Teachers' Association (PPTA) union. As President she was critical of then-Education Minister Hekia Parata on teaching issues including Novopay and charter schools. In 2017 she took up a teaching position at Stratford High School, resigning as PPTA president, instead becoming senior vice president of the PPTA.

Subsequently, Roberts was involved in the Just Transition Summit conversations in Taranaki. She took a particular interest in the role of education and training in sustaining future businesses and workforce.

Member of Parliament

There was speculation she would run as a Labour Party candidate in the 2017 election, a notion Roberts did not rule out. However, at the last minute, she decided against running.

Since she was ranked 50th on Labour's party list, Roberts was elected to Parliament.

Personal life
Roberts lives in Tariki with her husband Ian Anglesey, who is also a teacher, and their two children. She enjoys beach walking, tramping and community theatre.

References

1960s births
Living people
New Zealand Labour Party MPs
Members of the New Zealand House of Representatives
New Zealand list MPs
21st-century New Zealand politicians
21st-century New Zealand women politicians
Women members of the New Zealand House of Representatives
People from Taranaki